Phymatopus behrensii is a species of moth belonging to the family Hepialidae. It was described by Stretch in 1872, and is known from the United States, including California and Washington.

The wingspan is about 43 mm.

Recorded food plants for the species include Helenium, Lupinus, Malus, and various ferns.

References

Hepialidae
Moths described in 1872